Stephanie Louise Waring (born 19 February 1978) is an English actress, known for portraying the role of Cindy Cunningham in the Channel 4 soap opera Hollyoaks. In addition to her work on Hollyoaks, she has also had roles on Coronation Street, Doctors, Holby City, Crash Palace and Merseybeat, as well as competing in the tenth series of Dancing on Ice.

Personal life
Waring was born in Urmston, Greater Manchester on 19 February 1978 and attended Flixton Girls' High School. Waring has two daughters, Mia, born 2005, and Lexi Grace, born 2010. Waring was in a relationship with Dan Hooper who is Lexi's father. Waring suffered with post-natal depression after having daughter Lexi. After dating Tom Brookes for one year, the couple became engaged on 19 December 2021.

Career
Waring has appeared in various British television series since 1999, including Nice Guy Eddie, Merseybeat and  Holby City. She has also acted overseas, playing the lead in the Australian television drama series, Crash Palace in 2001. Waring auditioned for the characters of Tracy Barlow and Claire Peacock, both of Coronation Street, but lost out to Kate Ford and Julia Haworth respectively. Waring appeared in Coronation Street as Emma, a character who had given birth to Jason Grimshaw's child after a one-night stand, initially on Christmas Day in 2006 and then the following Easter when the character discovered the child's father was actually the late Charlie Stubbs.

Waring is known for portraying Cindy Cunningham in Hollyoaks, taking over the role from Laura Crossley in 1996. She initially played the role until 2000 and returned briefly in both 2002 and 2004. In May 2008 it was announced Waring would return to the serial on a regular basis after executive producer Bryan Kirkwood felt the serial needed to bring back some established characters. Cindy's return aired on 9 June 2008. Waring appeared as her character in the second series of Hollyoaks Later. In March 2010 it was announced Waring would leave the role temporarily for maternity leave, her exit aired on 24 September 2010 and she returned to the serial 9 March 2011. In 2018, she was a contestant on series 10 of Dancing on Ice and was second to be eliminated.

Filmography

Awards and nominations

References

External links

1978 births
Living people
English soap opera actresses
People from Urmston